Sean Eadie (born 15 April 1969 in Sydney, Australia) is a retired professional track cyclist. He lives in Como, New South Wales. He started cycling at 10 and became a professional in 1990. Despite competitive aggression on the track, he is a "gentle giant" off the track. Prior to becoming a full-time cyclist, Eadie was a kindergarten teacher. He was awarded a Diploma of Teaching (Primary) from the Australian Catholic University.

In 2002 Eadie broke the Commonwealth Games record for a flying 200m in 10.145 on his way to winning silver in the sprint.

Eadie competed in the 2004 Olympic Games in Athens following controversy. He was cleared by the Court of Arbitration for Sport, after insufficient evidence, of allegations that he had tried to import human growth hormone. A package containing Peptides was sent to Eadie from San Diego. It was intercepted by customs officers. At the hearing, Eadie said that he did not know who had sent the package and that checks of his credit-card records would show no link. Eadie has never failed a drugs test.

Eadie is known for his large beard, which earned him many nicknames, including Captain Haddock. In an interview with Cyclingnews.com's Lucy Power, he was asked if it was counter-aerodynamic to shave his legs but not his face. He said he had "won the team sprint and went 10.14 in Manchester, won the world's - wasn't too counter productive!" He said he shaved his legs "because it feels great in bed".

Palmarès

1995
1st Sprint, Oceania Titles, QLD
2nd Keirin, Oceania Titles, QLD
2nd Sprint, Australian National Track Championships
4th Time Trial, Oceania Titles, QLD

1996
2nd Team Sprint, Australian National Track Championships
3rd Sprint, World Cup, COL
3rd Sprint, Australian National Track Championships

1997
3rd Team Sprint, UCI Track Cycling World Championships (with Danny Day & Shane Kelly)
1st Team Sprint, World Cup, AUS
1st Team Sprint, Australian National Track Championships
2nd Sprint, Australian National Track Championships
3rd Sprint, World Cup, RSA
3rd Team Sprint, World Cup, COL
4th Keirin, Australian National Track Championships

1998
2nd Sprint, Commonwealth Games
2nd Sprint, World Cup, FRA
2nd Flying 200m, Australian National Track Championships
3rd Team Sprint, Australian National Track Championships

1999
2nd Team Sprint, Oceania International Grand Prix, NSW
3rd Sprint, Oceania International Grand Prix, NSW
3rd Sprint, Australian National Track Championships
3rd Keirin, Australian National Track Championships
4th Flying 200m, Australian National Track Championships

2000
3rd Team Sprint, Olympic Games (with Gary Neiwand & Darryn Hill)
1st Flying 200m, Australian National Track Championships
1st Team Sprint, Australian National Track Championships
1st Sprint, Australian National Track Championships
1st Sprint, Qantas Cup NSW
2nd Flying 200m, Qantas Cup NSW
4th Sprint, World Cup, COL
Geo Adam Trophy - Ride of the Series Australian Track Titles

2001
2nd Team Sprint, UCI Track Cycling World Championships (with Jobie Dajka & Ryan Bayley)
1st Sprint, Goodwill Games AUS
1st Team Sprint, Oceania Titles AUS
2nd Team Sprint, Australian National Track Championships
2nd Keirin, Australian National Track Championships
3rd Keirin, Goodwill Games AUS
3rd Sprint, Oceania Titles AUS
3rd Flying 200m, Australian National Track Championships
3rd Sprint, Australian National Track Championships
4th Team Sprint, World Cup, COL

2002
1st Team Sprint, 2002 Commonwealth Games (with Jobie Dajka & Ryan Bayley)
1st Sprint, UCI Track Cycling World Championships
2nd Team Sprint, UCI Track Cycling World Championships (with Jobie Dajka & Ryan Bayley)
2nd Sprint, 2002 Commonwealth Games Games Record 10.145sec
1st Keirin, World Cup, AUS
1st Sprint, World Cup, AUS
1st Flying 200m, Australian National Track Championships
1st Sprint, Australian National Track Championships
1st Team Sprint, Australian National Track Championships
2nd Team Sprint, World Cup, RUS
2nd Keirin, Australian National Track Championships

2004
1st Sprint, Australian National Track Championships
1st 1 lap Time Trial, Australian National Track Championships
4th Team Sprint, Olympic Games

2005
1st Sprint, Oceania Titles AUS

References

1969 births
Living people
Australian Institute of Sport cyclists
Australian male cyclists
Commonwealth Games gold medallists for Australia
Cyclists at the 1998 Commonwealth Games
Cyclists at the 2002 Commonwealth Games
Cyclists from Sydney
Olympic medalists in cycling
UCI Track Cycling World Champions (men)
Olympic cyclists of Australia
Cyclists at the 2000 Summer Olympics
Cyclists at the 2004 Summer Olympics
Medalists at the 2000 Summer Olympics
Commonwealth Games silver medallists for Australia
Olympic bronze medalists for Australia
Commonwealth Games medallists in cycling
Australian track cyclists
Medallists at the 1998 Commonwealth Games
Medallists at the 2002 Commonwealth Games